The Grange School is an 11–18 mixed, foundation secondary school and sixth form in Aylesbury, Buckinghamshire, England. It was established in 1954 and is part of the Aylesbury Learning Partnership.

History 
In 1959, the school was visited by Princess Marina, Duchess of Kent in celebration of the 10th anniversary of Mother's Clubs in Buckinghamshire. The school is notable as the location where the jury retired to consider their verdict in the Great Train Robbery case in 1963. They used the room that is now the main office of the youth centre on the school site.

In early 2009, it was awarded Business and Enterprise status and underwent refurbishment in areas of the school, funded by the Business & Enterprise grant.

It was used as a filming location in the iconic 2016 film Aylesbury Dead, where the main character David (played by David Davids) visits at the start of the film to collect his girlfriend (who just so happens to be in Year 10) to take her to Maccies.

Notable alumni 

 Jake Gray, professional footballer
 Robert Hall, professional footballer
 Samantha Louise Lewthwaite, terrorist suspect and widow of 7/7 suicide bomber
 John Otway, singer-songwriter
 Matt Phillips, professional footballer
 Iain Rogerson, actor
 Ellen White, professional footballer

References

External links 
 

Aylesbury
Foundation schools in Buckinghamshire
Secondary schools in Buckinghamshire
Educational institutions established in 1954
1954 establishments in England